Santander Park is located in Cúcuta, Colombia. The park is bordered by 5th and 6th Avenue and 10th and 11th Street and was previously the location of the Grand Square of San José de Guasimales, a site hosting principal events and public spectacles in Cúcuta. In the center of the park is a bronze statue of the Cúcuta-born Francisco de Paula Santander, created by the German sculptor Carl Bornr and unveiled on August 5, 1890.

The Cathedral of San José and Cúcuta's city hall are located at the park's edges.

See also 

 House of Santander
 Historic church of Cúcuta
 House of the Bagatela
 Great Colombian Park

References 

Cúcuta
Francisco de Paula Santander
Parks in Colombia
Tourist attractions in Norte de Santander Department